Fairy dust is used by Tinker Bell in Peter Pan.

Fairy Dust may also refer to:
Fairy Dust, a fragrance released by Paris Hilton
Fairy Dust (film), a 2016 short film by Tove Lo
"Fairy Dust", a song by Tove Lo from Lady Wood
"Fairy Dust", a song by Joe Jackson from Volume 4